The Confederate Monument was a memorial installed in Los Angeles' Hollywood Forever Cemetery, in the U.S. state of California, honoring all Confederates who had died or would die on the Pacific coast. Erected in 1925 in the Confederate section of the cemetery, it was removed in August 2017.

Description
The quotation on the plaque is from Rudyard Kipling's poem "Recessional" (1897): "Lord God of Hosts, be with us yet,  Lest we forget—lest we forget!"

History
The monument was "covered with a tarp and whisked away in the middle of the night after activists called for its removal and vandals spray-painted the word 'No' on its back," on August 15, 2017. This was inspired by the events of the white nationalist Unite the Right rally in Charlottesville, Virginia, on August 11–12.

See also

 List of Confederate monuments and memorials
 Removal of Confederate monuments and memorials

References

2017 disestablishments in California
Buildings and structures in Los Angeles
Monuments and memorials in California
Outdoor sculptures in Greater Los Angeles
Relocated buildings and structures in California
Removed Confederate States of America monuments and memorials
Vandalized works of art in California
Culture of Hollywood, Los Angeles